Dobri Do is a village in the municipality of Kuršumlija, Serbia. According to the 2002 census, the village has a population of 109 people.

References

Populated places in Toplica District